France has, due to its Overseas departments and regions that are scattered in all the oceans of Earth, the largest exclusive economic zone of the world. It covers approximately 8% of the surface of all the EEZs of the world, while the French Republic is only 0.45% of the world's land surface.

Geography

Monaco's waters are enclaves in the French EEZ. The situation is more unclear for the Channel Islands. Some maps show the EEZ being enclaved by the French EEZ, while others show the Guernsey EEZ extending to the border with the UK EEZ.

Outside of mainland France and overseas departments or communities (Guadeloupe, Guyane, Martinique, Mayotte, Réunion and Saint Martin), none of the territories below, and therefore their EEZ, is part of the European Union.

Disputes

Active
 France claims some of Canada's EEZ at Saint Pierre and Miquelon, based on a new definition of the continental shelf and the exclusive economic zone between the two countries. Saint Pierre and Miquelon is entirely surrounded by Canada's EEZ.
 Mauritius claims sovereignty over Tromelin although it is not mentioned in the listing of the 8th article of the 1814 Paris Treaty. It is administered as part of the French Southern and Antarctic Lands.

References

External links
 Areas of France's maritime spaces of sovereignty and jurisdiction

France
Borders of France
Economy of France